Manjula (Sanskrit: मंजुला) is a Hindu and Sanskrit female given name, which means, "melodious".

Notable people named Manjula 
 Manjula (Kannada actress) (1954–1986), Indian actress
 Manjula Chellur (born 1955), Indian doctor and judge
 Manjula Dayal, Fijian businesswoman
 Manjula Dissanayake (born 1967), Sri Lankan politician
 Manjula Ghattamaneni (born 1970), Indian actress and producer
 Manjula Guruge (born 1981), Emirati cricketer
 Manjula Munasinghe (born 1971), Sri Lankan cricketer
 Manjula Padmanabhan (born 1953), Indian playwright, artist and writer.
 Manjula Vijayakumar (1953– 2013), Indian actress
 Manjula Kumara Wijesekara (born 1984), Sri Lankan high jumper
 Mañjula (astronomer)/Muñjāla (fl. 932), Indian astronomer
 Sudath Manjula (born 1972), Sri Lankan politician

Fictional characters 
Manjula Nahasapeemapetilon, from animated TV series The Simpsons

Song

There was also a song by the name of Manjula. It was created by Indian singer Baba Sehgal.

References

Hindu given names
Indian feminine given names
Sinhalese masculine given names
Sinhalese surnames
Sinhalese feminine given names